The 2016 CONCACAF Women's U-17 Championship qualification was a women's under-17 football competition which decided the participating teams of the 2016 CONCACAF Women's U-17 Championship. Players born on or after 1 January 1999 were eligible to compete in the tournament.

A total of eight teams qualified to play in the final tournament, where the berths were allocated to the three regional zones as follows:
Three teams from the North American Zone (NAFU), i.e., Canada, Mexico and the United States, who all qualified automatically
Two teams from the Central American Zone (UNCAF)
Three teams from the Caribbean Zone (CFU), including Grenada who qualified automatically as hosts

The top three teams of the final tournament qualified for the 2016 FIFA U-17 Women's World Cup in Jordan.

Teams
A total of 27 CONCACAF member national teams entered the tournament. Among them, four teams qualified automatically for the final tournament, and 23 teams entered the regional qualifying competitions.

Notes
1 Non-FIFA member, ineligible for World Cup.

Central American zone

In the Central American Zone, all seven UNCAF member national teams entered the qualifying competition. They were divided into one group of four teams and one group of three teams, as drawn on 28 February 2015 at the UNCAF Executive Committee meeting in Managua, Nicaragua. Group A was played between 4–8 November 2015 in Guatemala, while Group B was played between 11–15 November in Honduras (originally between 27–31 October 2015 before Panama withdrew). The two group winners qualified for the final tournament as the UNCAF representatives.

Times UTC−6.

Group A

Group B

Goalscorers
5 goals

 Merilyn Alvarado
 Gloriana Villalobos

4 goals

 María Paula Salas
 Ashley Cruz

2 goals

 Hillary Corrales
 Valeria del Campo
 Karla Moulds
 Niurka Oliva
 Lisbeth Bonilla
 Katherine Mejía
 Sandra Ponce
 Fátima Romero

1 goal

 Shandy Vernon
 Carmen Marín
 Yedry Salas
 María Sanabria
 Astrid López
 Kali MacNally
 Ashley Tobar
 Yuvitza Mayén
 Kiara Martínez
 Yessenia Flores

Caribbean zone

In the Caribbean Zone, 16 CFU member national teams entered the qualifying competition (Dominica was not included in the original draw, but was later added). Among them, 15 teams entered the first round, where they were divided into three groups of four teams and one group of three teams. The groups were played between 15–19 July and 22–26 August 2015 and hosted by one of the teams in each group. The four group winners, the two best runners-up of the four-team groups, and the runner-up of the three-team group advanced to the final round to be joined by final round hosts Puerto Rico.

In the final round, played between 13–22 November 2015 in Puerto Rico, the eight teams were divided into two groups of four teams, where the top two teams of each group advanced to play a single-elimination tournament. The top two teams qualified for the final tournament as the CFU representatives besides hosts Grenada.

Times UTC−4; UTC−3 for Group 4.

First round

Group 1
Matches played in Dominican Republic.

Group 2
Matches played in Haiti.

Group 3
Matches played in Saint Kitts and Nevis. In the original draw, the group included only three teams, but Dominica was later added to this group.

The second round of matches, originally scheduled for 24 August (17:30 and 20:00), were delayed to 25 August due to a tropical storm.

Group 4
Matches played in Suriname.

Ranking of second-placed teams
In addition to the runner-up of Group 2 (with three teams), the two best runners-up of Groups 1, 3 and 4 (with four teams) also advance to the final round.

Final round
Matches played in Puerto Rico.

Group A

Group B

Semi-finals
Winners qualified for 2016 CONCACAF Women's U-17 Championship.

Third place playoff

Final

Goalscorers
14 goals
 Nérilia Mondésir

7 goals
 Nia Honore

6 goals

 Lilian Pérez
 Jody Brown

5 goals

 Yilianny Sablon
 Nelourde Nicolas
 Tarania Clarke
 Rena Gordon
 Laurelle Theodore
 Ranae Ward

4 goals

 Dayarí Balbuena
 Lovelie Pierre
 Marlee Fray
 Ángela Díaz

3 goals

 Shaunte Carrington
 Leilanni Nesbeth
 María López
 Melissa Dacius
 Roseline Éloissaint
 Shanhaine Nelson
 Chayenne Dompig
 Kaydeen Jack

2 goals

 Nashandi Clarke
 Felicia Jarvis
 Chelsea Green
 Sabrina Suberan
 Dolores Jean-Thomas
 Mikerline Saint-Félix
 Sherice Clarke
 Monique Perrier
 Zynzelle Pemberton
 Amaya Ellis
 Alexis Fortune
 Kelsey Henry

1 goal

 Hannan Simms
 Caitlin Padmore
 Nia Christopher
 Zakiyah Durham
 Teyah Lindo
 Symira Lowe-Darrell
 Emily Lowery
 Katie Lowery
 Nahomi Aguilar
 Braysi Cabrera
 Wendy Corcho
 Maidevis Espinosa
 Sairy Ferrer
 Maristiania Mengana
 Yenifer Ramos
 Yilien Sarria
 Lindsay Hart
 Sjulienne Martina
 Carmen Cambiazo
 Ana Taveras
 Minely Ureña
 Melchie Dumornay
 Wagnelada Millien
 Tateyana Pitter
 Shayla Smart
 Josephine Cotto
 Shaniqua Browne
 Zhane Phillip
 Brandy Renfrum
 Nancy Righters
 Shania Tjoen A Choy
 Raenah Campbell
 Asha James
 Natisha John
 Shenieka Paul

Note: Two goals scored by Dominica missing goalscorer information.

Qualified teams
The following eight teams qualified for the final tournament.

1 Bold indicates champion for that year. Italic indicates host for that year.

References

External links
Under 17s – Women, CONCACAF.com
Fútbol Femenino Sub-17, UNCAFut.com 
Women's U17, CFUfootball.org

Qualification
Women's U-17 Championship qualification
Concacaf Women's U-17 Championship qualification
2016 in youth association football
2016